John Dwight Pentecost (April 24, 1915 – April 28, 2014) was an American Christian theologian, best known for his book Things to Come.

Pentecost was born in Pennsylvania and died in Dallas, Texas.  His wife was Dorothy Harrison Pentecost (June 17, 1915 – June 21, 2000). John and Dorothy had two daughters: Jane Pentecost Fenby and Gwendolyn Ann Pentecost Arnold.

Pentecost was Distinguished Professor of Bible Exposition, Emeritus, at Dallas Theological Seminary, one of only two so honored. He held a B.A. from Hampden-Sydney College (1937), in addition to Th.M. (1941) and Th.D. (1956) degrees from Dallas Theological Seminary. During his academic career he taught biblical subjects for over 60 years (Philadelphia College of Bible, 1948–55; Dallas Theological Seminary, 1955-2014). His nearly twenty books are written mostly for the general Christian reader. His pastoral career continued through this period.
 Ordained at Cambridge Springs, Pennsylvania (Presbyterian Church) in 1941
 Pastor at the same Cambridge Springs, Pennsylvania (Presbyterian Church) from 1941 to 1946
 Pastor at Devon, Pennsylvania (Saint John's Presbyterian Church) from 1946 to 1951
 Pastor at Dallas, Texas (Grace Bible Church) from 1958 to 1976

He traveled worldwide, speaking on his specialist subjects. A Festschrift, Essays in Honor of J. Dwight Pentecost, has been written. Edited by Stanley D. Toussaint and Charles H. Dyer, it was published by Moody Press in January 1986.

Writings
Pentecost is possibly best known for his published writings, which are predominantly focused on issues of Christian living and the eschatological scriptures. Pentecost took a Premillennial and Pretribulational view of the unfulfilled prophetic passages of the apocalyptic biblical literature. He had a Dispensationalist position, however, and his Things to Come (1958) is characterized by a comprehensive review of almost every view on the biblical prophetic subject matter that has any form of prominence.

Bibliography
 Things to Come, Zondervan, 1958 
 Prophecy for Today : God's Purpose and Plan for Our Future, Zondervan, 1961 
 Will Man Survive?
 The Parables of the Kingdom
 Pattern for Maturity (since retitled Designed to Be Like Him)
 The Joy of Intimacy with God : A Bible Study Guide to 1 John, Discovery House
 Faith That Endures : A Practical Commentary on the Book of Hebrews, 2000  rev. ed.
 The Divine Comforter : The Person and Work of the Holy Spirit, Kregel, 1963 
 Designed to be Like Him : Understanding God's Plan for Fellowship, Conduct, Conflict, and Maturity, 1966
 Your Adversary, the Devil, 1969
 Life’s Problems-God’s Solutions : Answers to 15 of Life's most Perplexing Problems, 1971
 The Joy of Living : Study of Philippians, Kregel 1973  
 Profecías para el Mundo Moderno 1973
 Design for Living : Lessons on Holiness from the Sermon on the Mount, Kregel, 1975 
 The Sermon on the Mount : Contemporary Insights for a Christian Lifestyle, Multnomah Press, Portland, 1980
 The Words and Works of Jesus Christ : A Study of the Life of Christ, Zondervan, 1981 
 A Harmony of the Words & Works of Jesus Christ, Zondervan, 1981 
 The Parables of Jesus : Lessons in Life from the Master Teacher, 1982
 Thy Kingdom Come : Tracing God's Kingdom Program and Covenant Promises Throughout History, Kregel, 1995 
 Things Which become Sound Doctrine : Doctrinal Studies of Fourteen Crucial Words of Faith, Kregel, 1996  
 Design for Discipleship : Discovering God's Blueprint for the Christian Life, Kregel, 1996 
 New Wine: A Study of Transition in the Book of Acts.Kregel, 2010

Notes

References

External links
 Photo and booklist.

1915 births
2014 deaths
American theologians
Christian writers
Dallas Theological Seminary faculty
Hampden–Sydney College alumni
Dallas Theological Seminary alumni